Tim Robertson is an Australian actor and writer.

He is a graduate of the University of Western Australia] (1965) and taught at Flinders University in Adelaide, where he began adapting and directing plays. He joined the Australian Performing Group at the Pram Factory in Melbourne, where he wrote, acted, and directed plays.

In 2001 he published a history of the Pram Factory.

Partial filmography

 The Cars That Ate Paris (1974)
 The Chant of Jimmie Blacksmith (1978)
 Locusts and Wild Honey (1980)
 Scales of Justice (1983 TV miniseries)
 Phar Lap (1983)
 The Last Bastion (1984)
 A Thousand Skies (1985)
 Bliss (1985)
 Vietnam (1986)
 The Clean Machine (1988)
 The Heroes (1989)
 The Big Steal (1990)
 Chances (TV series)
 Police Crop: The Winchester Conspiracy (1994)
 Halifax f.p. episode "Hard Corps" (1995)
 Kangaroo Palace (1997)
 Holy Smoke (1999)

References

External links
 
 Tim Robertson at Film Reference

1944 births
Living people
English emigrants to Australia
Australian male film actors
Australian male television actors